Martin Mortensen may refer to:

 Martin Mortensen (cyclist) (born 1984), Danish racing cyclist
 Martin Mortensen (academic) (1872–1953), American professor and head of the Department of Dairy Industry at Iowa State College